Malakisi or Malikisi is a settlement in Kenya's Bungoma County.

Malikisi means a place of Gold from the local communities in the area.

References 

Populated places in Bungoma County